The Tulieta GT was an Argentinean coupé manufactured by Crespi. It was both first and last produced in 1977.

References

Cars of Argentina

Cars introduced in 1977